Shanghai Theatre Academy is a public university in Shanghai, People's Republic of China dedicated to dramatic art education. Its predecessor was Shanghai Municipal Experimental Theatre School cofounded by the famous educator Gu Yuxiu (顾毓琇). Its alumni include actresses Pan Hong, Li Bingbing, Xing Fei, Fan Bingbing, Li Qin, Dilraba Dilmurat, Ma Yili, Xiao Song Jia, Wan Qian and Zhang Yuqi, and actors Tong Dawei, Lu Yi, and Deng Lun.

Famous alumni

Class year indicates the entrance year, not graduating year.
Class of 1974: Xu Xing
Class of 1976: Pan Hong
Class of 1980: Ding Jiali
Class of 1981: Wang Luoyong, Song Jia
Class of 1984: You Yong
Class of 1985: Guo Donglin
Class of 1986: Chen Hong
Class of 1987: Liu Qiong, Wang Hui
Class of 1989: Zhou Jie
Class of 1990: Xu Zheng
Class of 1993: Li Bingbing, Liao Fan, Li Yu
Class of 1994: Ma Yili
Class of 1995: Lu Yi, Li Qian
Class of 1996: Hao Lei, Nie Yuan, Chen Sicheng
Class of 1997: Tong Dawei, Yan Yikuan, Feng Shaofeng, Yang Rong, Yu Zheng
Class of 2000: Wan Qian
Class of 2001: Hu Ge, Han Xue, Yuan Hong
Class of 2002: Sun Yizhou, Monica Mok, Lei Jiayin
Class of 2003: Xu Haiqiao
Class of 2004: Jiang Shuying, Li Jinming, Zhao Ji, Zheng Kai, Chen He, Eric Wang, Du Jiang, Luo Yunxi
Class of 2005: Jin Shijia, Luo Yunxi
Class of 2006: Li Jiahang, Lou Yixiao
Class of 2007: Lin Gengxin, Purba Rgyal
Class of 2008: Li Qin, Wang Yanlin
Class of 2009: Jiang Jinfu, Zhang Zhehan
Class of 2010: Dilraba Dilmurat, Merxat, Yuan Bingyan, Huang Shijia
Class of 2011: Deng Lun
Class of 2012: Elvis Han, Vin Zhang, Peng Yuchang, Xing Fei, Xu Weizhou
Class of 2013: Ding Yuxi
Class of 2014: Zhu Zhengting
Class of 2015: Zeng Keni, Ding Yuxi
Class of 2016: Qiu Xinyi
Class of 2017: Xia Zhiguang, Wang Churan
Class of 2019: Sun Zhenni

References

External links
 Official website
 Website of Shanghai Theatre Academy on cinaoggi.it

Universities and colleges in Shanghai
Drama schools in China
Film schools in China
Culture in Shanghai
Asian Cultural Council grantees
Schools of Chinese opera